The Center Street Bridge is an automobile bridge located in Salem, Oregon, United States. It spans the Willamette River, connecting West Salem and Oregon Route 22 to Salem. It carries vehicle traffic eastbound from Route 22 and directly from Wallace Road. Traffic exits onto Center Street directly, and onto Front Street via an off-ramp, which was built in 1977. Construction of the bridge started in 1917. The bridge was officially opened on July 30, 1918, to two-way vehicle traffic. It was later switched to eastbound-only when the westbound-only Marion Street Bridge opened in 1954. Center Street Bridge replaced the steel bridge that had been built in 1891, and was reconstructed in 1983 after the completion of a widening project from two to four lanes on the Marion Street Bridge.

See also 
 List of crossings of the Willamette River

References

External links 
Historic images of Center Street Bridge from Salem Public Library

Bridges completed in 1918
Buildings and structures in Salem, Oregon
Bridges over the Willamette River
Transportation in Salem, Oregon
Transportation buildings and structures in Polk County, Oregon
Transportation buildings and structures in Marion County, Oregon
Road bridges in Oregon
1918 establishments in Oregon
Steel bridges in the United States
Plate girder bridges in the United States